Georgina Moon is a British actress. 

Her television roles include Lt. Sylvia Howell in UFO, Erotica in Up Pompeii!, Rose Bivaque in Clochemerle, Miss Finch in You're Only Young Twice and Christine Cropper in How's Your Father?.

She has featured in several films, including Carry On Camping, Bless This House and Carry On Behind.

Her father was the actor George Moon.

Selected filmography
 The Mind Benders (1963)
 The Assassination Bureau (1969)
 Carry On Camping (1969)
 Up Pompeii! (1969)
 Fragment of Fear (1970)
 Bless This House (1972)
 Carry On Behind (1975)
 You're Only Young Twice (1977–81)

References

External links 

Living people
English television actresses
English film actresses
1950s births